Gu Bon-seung (born September 11, 1973) is a South Korean actor and singer.

Filmography

Film

Television series

References

External links

1973 births
Living people
South Korean male television actors
South Korean male film actors
South Korean male musical theatre actors
South Korean male singers
Myongji University alumni
South Korean Buddhists